The Pious Agent is a 1975 spy thriller novel by the British writer John Braine.

Synopsis
Xavier Flynn, a devout Catholic but ruthless agent, is on the track of a secret revolutionary movement trying to sabotage Britain.

References

Bibliography
 Jenny Stringer & John Sutherland. The Oxford Companion to Twentieth-century Literature in English. Oxford University Press, 1996.

1975 British novels
Novels by John Braine
British thriller novels
British spy novels
Methuen Publishing books